Hallikhed (B) is a town in the northern part of southern state of Karnataka, India. It is located in the Humnabad taluk of Bidar district in Karnataka.It is 33km from Bidar and 20km from Humnabad.It is near to NH-50.It is well connected by roadways and railway.

Demographics
 India census, Hallikhed(B) had a population of 17162 with 8963 males and 8199 females.
It has famous temple - Naganath temple.

See also
 Bidar
 Districts of Karnataka

References

External links
 http://Bidar.nic.in/

hallikhed b is a very beautiful village, with karanja Dam nearby and wonderful people

Villages in Bidar district